Line S1 of the Taizhou Rail Transit is a suburban rapid transit line in Taizhou, Zhejiang Province, China. It runs from Taizhou Huochezhan to Chengnan. The line started operation on 28 December 2022.

Stations

References

S1
Railway lines opened in 2022
Rapid transit lines in China